The Raja Ramanna Centre for Advanced Technology is a unit of Department of Atomic Energy, Government of India, engaged in R&D in non-nuclear front-line research areas of lasers, particle accelerators and related technologies.

History

On 19 February 1984 the then president of India, Gyani Zail Singh, laid the foundation stone of the centre. Construction of laboratories and houses began in May 1984. In June 1986, the first batch of scientists from Bhabha Atomic Research Centre (BARC), Mumbai, moved to RRCAT and scientific activities were started. Since then, the centre has rapidly grown into a premier institute for research and development in lasers, accelerators and their applications. Originally called the Centre for Advanced Technology, it was renamed by the Indian Prime Minister in December 2005 as Raja Ramanna Centre for Advanced Technology, after noted Indian physicist Raja Ramanna.

Location

The centre is situated at the south-western end of the Indore, Madhya Pradesh.  It is about 11 km from the Indore Railway station as well as the Indore airport.  The nearest residential locality is Rajendra Nagar.

Research activities

RRCAT has developed two synchrotron radiation sources called "Indus": Indus-1 is a 450 MeV electron storage ring, whereas Indus-2 is a booster cum storage ring that can accelerate electrons from an injection energy of 550 MeV to 2.5 GeV. RRCAT also provides training to young scientists at BARC Training School located in its campus who later joined several DAE units like BARC Mumbai, IGCAR Kalpakkam, VECC Kolkata and RRCAT as Scientific Officers. It also provides a strong basis of front line research for external Ph.D. scholar in the related fields.

RRCAT has also been actively involved in providing scientific and material assistance to the CERN sponsored
Large Hadron Collider.
In addition to this, the centre conducts Trainings, Doctoral Programs to take up research and development work in the frontline areas of particle accelerators, lasers, cryogenics, superconductivity, plasma physics and related high technology fields.

References

External links
 Official Website

Atomic Energy Commission of India
Research institutes in Madhya Pradesh
Homi Bhabha National Institute
Education in Indore
Science and technology in Indore
Research institutes established in 1986
1986 establishments in Madhya Pradesh